In the AFL Women's (AFLW), the Gabrielle Trainor Medal is the name of the award given to the best and fairest player at the Greater Western Sydney Giants during the home-and-away season. The naming of the award is in honour of Gabrielle Trainor, an inaugural Giants board member and member of the AFL Commission known for pioneering the development of women's Australian rules football in New South Wales during her ten years on the AFL NSW/ACT Commission prior to joining the Giants. The award has been awarded annually since the competition's inaugural season in 2017, and Jessica Dal Pos was the inaugural winner of the award.

Recipients

See also

 Kevin Sheedy Medal (list of Greater Western Sydney Giants best and fairest winners in the Australian Football League)

References

AFL Women's awards
Lists of AFL Women's players
   
Awards established in 2017